John Comiskey (1826 – January 8, 1900)  was an Irish-American Democratic Party politician in Chicago, Illinois. He was the father of Charles Comiskey.

Life
John Comiskey was born in Crosserlough, County Cavan, Ireland, in 1826, and in 1848 he came to New Haven, Connecticut, United States. There he interested himself in the lumber business. In 1853 he came to Chicago, Illinois and took charge of the incoming freight on the Chicago, Rock Island, and Pacific Railroad until 1863 when he engaged his services to Shufeldt & Croskey, the prominent distillers. He then became connected with the Fort Wayne, Indiana cattle yards as superintendent of shipments. His first political experience, may be said was in the Internal Revenue Service under Gen Wallace, acting under the administration of Andrew Johnson. On the election of Ulysses Grant, Comiskey being a Democrat was removed. In 1870, he was employed as a bookkeeper by Henry Greenebaum, the successful banker of that period. In 1875, he was appointed Clerk of the Board of Cook County Commissioners. In 1878, on the expiration of his term of office, he entered the book trade. He then entered the service of the city and was a bookkeeper in the city treasurer's office. Comiskey served eleven years in the Chicago City Council. He was first elected in the spring of 1859 to represent the tenth ward. At that time, there were only ten wards in the city. A subdivision of the wards complicated aldermanic politics forthwith. In 1861, he was elected to represent the seventh ward, also in 1863 and 64 in 66 to represent the eighth ward, and in 68 to represent the ninth ward. In the last year of his term in the Council, he was elected as President the first time the office was created. For a quarter of a century, Comiskey figured prominently before the public. His voice was always being heard on the side of reform. His independence of character was well known. Among the most notable of his recent achievements was his introduction of the John F. Finerty to the people of the second district which, although overwhelmingly Democratic, elected Finerty to congress independently.

He died at his home in Chicago on January 8, 1900, and was buried at Calvary Cemetery in Evanston.

References

Attribution
This article incorporates text from a publication now in the public domain: Political History of Chicago (covering the Period from 1837 to 1887). 1886

1826 births
1900 deaths
People from County Cavan
Politicians from Chicago
Irish emigrants to the United States (before 1923)
Chicago City Council members
Illinois Democrats
Comiskey family
19th-century American politicians
Burials at Calvary Cemetery (Evanston, Illinois)